Walter Rushton was an English footballer who played in the Football League for Bolton Wanderers.

Early Career
Walter Rushton signed for Blackburn Rovers in 1885 for the 1885-1886 Season. The club had already won the Cup twice from 1883-1885 and became the last club to complete a FA Cup hat-trick (three in a row). Rushton did not play in the Final. It is unknown if he played in the earlier rounds. He left Balckburn in 1888 and joined Bolton Wanderers.

Walter Rushton did not make his League debut until season 2, 1889–1890. However, Rushton was selected by Wanderers to play outside-right in their 3 FA Cup ties in 1888–1889 season. In the first 2 ties against Hurst and West Manchester Rushton was part of a forward line unable to score. both matches ended 0-0. However, on 17-Nov-1888 Rushton and his team were well beaten by Irish club, Linfield Athletic. The final score was 4–0 to Linfield.

References

Year of birth unknown
Year of death unknown
English footballers
Blackburn Rovers F.C. players
Bolton Wanderers F.C. players
Ardwick F.C. players
English Football League players
Association football wingers